Mordellistena rufiventris is a species of beetle in the genus Mordellistena of the family Mordellidae. It was described by Helmuth in 1864.

References

Beetles described in 1864
rufiventris